Lady Death: The Movie is a 2004 American adult animated fantasy action film based on the comic book character Lady Death. This film was the first animation project produced by now-defunct anime distributor A.D. Vision. It had premiered at the 2004 Comic-Con convention. The film was released on DVD October 9, 2004, and had been aired on A.D. Vision's Anime Network. This film has not been rated. A Blu-ray Disc edition of the film was released by AEsir Holdings and Section23 Films on September 20, 2011.

Plot synopsis

The movie begins in 15th century Sweden. Hope, the beautiful and innocent daughter of Matthias (a skilled mercenary who is in actuality Lucifer himself), is accused of being the Devil's consort. Hope is sentenced by the town priest to be burned at the stake. Matthias, through a proxy, offers her life if she surrenders herself to him and joins him in Hell. At first she agrees to his terms, but Matthias's plan to corrupt her is soon met with unanticipated resistance, as Hope rejects his scheme and eventually finds herself transformed into the powerful warrior Lady Death, who challenges Lucifer for control of Hell itself.

Differences between the film and comic
Many of the events from the comics are altered in the animated film. Instead of summoning a demon with whom she bargains for her life, Hope's spell summons a pair of flying demons that carry her physically to Hell (restoring her badly burned body in the process), dropping her in the court of her father, who intends for her to join him by his side. When she refuses, he casts her out, only for her to side with the master blacksmith Cremator, an escaped slave of his, and to lead an army of hellspawn creatures against him. In this continuity, her curse is to be trapped in Hell for as long as one of Lucifer's allies remains alive. Unlike in the comic, Lady Death is presented as more of a heroine whose goal isn't to destroy all life and creation on Earth, but to liberate Hell from Lucifer's tyranny.

Details
The castle of Matthias is based on Duurstede Castle.

Cast
 Christine Auten as Lady Death/Hope
 Mike Kleinhenz as Lucifer/Matthias
 Andy McAvin as Pagan
 Rob Mungle as Cremator
 Mike MacRae as Asmodeus, Large Torture Troll
 Chris Patton as Niccolo
 Dwight Clark as Father Orbec
 Maureen McCullough as Marion
 Ted Pfister as Elderly Man
 Marcy Rae as Elderly Woman
 Greg Ayres as Young Man
 Jason Douglas as Matthias Guards, Stable Demons
 Ben Pronsky as Matthias Guards
 John Swasey as General Ahriman, Torture Guards, Demon Priest
 James Faulkner as General Utuk Xul
 Laura Butcher as Lucifer's Concubines
 Marizol Cabrera-Ojeda as Lucifer's Concubines
 Shelley Calene-Black as Lucifer's Concubines
 Geana Lewis as Lucifer's Concubines
 Mary Marquez as Lucifer's Concubines
 Adam Colon as Small Tortue Troll

Reception
General reception has mostly been negative. Mike Dungan of Mania.com (then known as AnimeOnDvd.com) gave the film a C. Dungan states that the script limits the appeal of the movie. However, the animation and acting were fine in that this was a good first effort for ADV.

References

External links
 
 

2004 animated films
2004 horror films
American supernatural horror films
ADV Films
Animated films based on comics
Films based on American comics
Anime-influenced Western animation
2000s American animated films
2004 films
The Devil in film
2000s English-language films